Bailey Ridge is a serrate ridge  long, standing between Mount Blades and the Fleming Peaks in the Ford Ranges of Marie Byrd Land. It was discovered on aerial flights of the Byrd Antarctic Expedition in 1934, and named by the United States Antarctic Service (1939–41) for Clay W. Bailey, a member of both expeditions.

References 

Ridges of Marie Byrd Land